The 1980–81 season was Blackpool F.C.'s 73rd season (70th consecutive) in the Football League. They competed in the 24-team Division Three, then the third tier of English football, finishing second-bottom. As a result, they were relegated to Division Four, the League's basement division, for the first time in their history.

Alan Ball was succeeded as manager during the season by Allan Brown, the Scot's second stint in the role.

Colin Morris was the club's top scorer, with sixteen goals (twelve in the league, one in the FA Cup and three in the League Cup).

Blackpool played local neighbours Fleetwood Town in the first round of the FA Cup. The 22 November tie was originally scheduled to be played at the Fishermen's Highbury Stadium; instead, it was switched to Bloomfield Road, and since Blackpool were the "away" team, they played in their alternative light-blue kit.

Table

References

Blackpool F.C.
Blackpool F.C. seasons